Samuel James "Sugar Jim" Henry (October 23, 1920 — January 21, 2004) was a Canadian professional ice hockey player. A goaltender, Henry played in the National Hockey League (NHL) with the New York Rangers, Chicago Black Hawks and the Boston Bruins between 1941 and 1955.

Early life
Henry was born on October 23, 1920, in Winnipeg, Manitoba, Canada to mother Essie Henry. Growing up, he earned the nickname "Sugar" as the neighbours would dip his pacifier into sugar. During the 1930s, he played for the Brandon Elks in the Manitoba Junior Hockey League and led them to the Turnbull Cup. Following this, Henry joined the Regina Rangers of the Saskatchewan Junior Hockey League where he led them to the 1941 Allen Cup. During the tournament, Henry gained the attention of Frank Boucher of the New York Rangers.

Playing career
Upon winning the 1941 Allen Cup, Henry started his NHL career with the New York Rangers. During his first NHL season, he led the New York Rangers to a first-place but they lost to the Toronto Maple Leafs in the 1942 Stanley Cup Playoffs. Despite this, Henry's 29 wins during the season led all goaltenders around the league and set a new franchise record. Following his rookie season, World War II broke out and he joined the Ottawa Commandos and Red Deer Army. In 1942, while with the Commandos, Henry helped them sweep the competition and win another Allen Cup. He also played with the Red Deer A-16 Army team and was voted the most valuable player in the league. In 1945, Henry was discharged from the army and returned to the National Hockey League.

When the 1945–46 NHL season started, Henry alternated goaltending duties with Chuck Rayner. However, Rayner eventually took over starting duties and Henry was re-assigned to the New Haven Ramblers of the American Hockey League (AHL) in January 1946. Following this, he spent numerous seasons alternating between the NHL and AHL. During the 1947–48 season, Henry returned to his original starting position with the Rangers after Rayner suffered a compound fracture of his right cheekbone. Within his first 25 games as the starting goaltender, Henry earned 12 wins, seven losses, and six ties.

During the 1952 postseason, Henry recorded a playoff shutout in the semifinal round versus Montreal. At the end of Game #7 of that same series, Henry, sporting a black eye, was photographed shaking hands with Maurice Richard who was bandaged and bloodied. It has been considered one of the iconic NHL photographs.

In 2004, Henry was inducted into the Manitoba Sports Hall of Fame.

Awards and achievements
Turnbull Cup MJHL Championship (1939)
Allan Cup Championships (1941 & 1943)
USHL First All-Star Team (1950)
Charles Gardiner Memorial Trophy Winner (Top Goaltender USHL) (1950)
NHL Second All-Star Team (1952)
Played in NHL All-Star Game (1952)
Honoured Member of the Manitoba Hockey Hall of Fame

Career statistics

Regular season and playoffs

Transactions
 October 7, 1948 - Traded to Chicago Black Hawks by New York Rangers for Emile Francis and Alex Kaleta.
 July 13, 1950 - Traded to Detroit Red Wings by Chicago Black Hawks with Metro Prystai, Gaye Stewart and Bob Goldham for Harry Lumley, Jack Stewart, Al Dewsbury, Pete Babando and Don Morrison.
 September 28, 1951 - Traded to Boston Bruins by Detroit Red Wings for cash

References

External links

1920 births
2004 deaths
Boston Bruins players
Brandon Elks players
Canadian ice hockey goaltenders
Chicago Blackhawks players
Indianapolis Capitals players
New Haven Ramblers players
New York Rangers players
St. Paul Saints (IHL) players
Ice hockey people from Winnipeg
Warroad Lakers players
Winnipeg Maroons players
Manitoba Sports Hall of Fame inductees